Metropolitan Opera Radio may refer to:

Metropolitan Opera radio broadcasts, weekly Saturday live broadcasts from New York City's Metropolitan Opera
Metropolitan Opera Radio (Sirius XM), a channel on Sirius XM satellite radio